The Saint Benedict Medal is a Christian sacramental medal containing symbols and text related to the life of Saint Benedict of Nursia, used by Roman Catholics, Lutherans, Western Orthodox, Anglicans and Methodists, in the Benedictine Christian tradition, especially votarists and oblates.

This religious object is also a Christian symbol of opening doors and opening difficult paths. Tradition holds that it protects from curses, evil and vice, protects against diseases and protects good health.

The reverse side of the medal carries the Vade retro satana ('Begone, Satan!') Sometimes carried as part of a rosary, it is also worn separately.

History 

The exact time and date of the making of the first Saint Benedict Medal are not clear. The medal was originally a cross, dedicated to the devotion in honour of St. Benedict. At some point medals were struck that bore the image of St. Benedict holding a cross aloft in his right hand and his Rule for Monasteries in the other hand. Then a sequence of capital letters was placed around the large figure of the cross moline on the reverse side of the medal. The meaning of what the letters signified was lost over time until around 1647 an old manuscript was discovered at the Benedictine St. Michael's Abbey in Metten. In the manuscript, written in 1415, was a picture depicting St. Benedict holding in one hand a staff which ends in a cross, and a scroll in the other. On the staff and scroll were written in full the words of which the mysterious letters were the initials, a Latin prayer of exorcism against Satan. The manuscript contains the exorcism formula Vade retro satana ('Step back, Satan'), and the letters were found to correspond to this phrase.

The exorcism prayer is found in an early thirteenth century legend of the Devil's Bridge at Sens, wherein an architect sold his soul to the devil and then subsequently repented. M. le Curé of Sens, wearing his stole, exorcised the devil, driving him away with holy water and the words, which he made the penitent repeat.

Medals bearing the image of St. Benedict, a cross moline, and these letters began to be struck in Germany, and soon spread over Europe. Vincent de Paul (†1660) seems to have known of it, for his Daughters of Charity have always worn it attached to their beads, and for many years it was only made, at least in France, for them. The medals were first approved by Benedict XIV on 23 December, 1741, and again on 12 March, 1742. The medal in its traditional design was in use for many decades and is still in use today.

In Gabriel Bucelin's 1679 , he recounts several incidents in which St. Benedict's Medal was viewed as efficacious in addressing illness or some local calamity. In the 1743 , Abbot Löbl, of St. Margaret's Monastery of Prague, recommended recourse to the medal as a remedy against bleeding. Prosper Guéranger relates several incidents of religious conversions which he attributes to the intercession of St. Benedict through the pious use of the medal. 

The Jubilee medal was struck in 1880, in remembrance of the 1400th anniversary of St. Benedict’s birth. The initials of the  formula have been found on Saint Benedict Medals at least since 1780. The Jubilee medal continues to be the most popular design.

The medal’s symbolism 

On the back of the medal is Saint Benedict holding a cross in his right hand, the Christian symbol of salvation, and in the left his Rule for Monasteries. To Benedict's right, below the cross, is a poisoned cup, a reference to the legend that hostile monks attempted to poison him, and the cup containing poisoned wine shattered when the saint made the sign of the cross over it. To his left, below the rule, the raven that carried off a loaf of poisoned bread. From this is derived the tradition that the medal protects against poisoning.

Above the cup and raven are the words  ('The Cross of [our] Holy Father Benedict'). Surrounding the figure of Saint Benedict are the words  ('May we be strengthened by his presence in the hour of our death'), since Benedictines regarded him as a particular patron of a happy death. Below the icon of St. Benedict, it is written 'EX SM Casino, MDCCCLXXX' and it means 'Found out from the holy Casino mountain in 1880.'

On the front is a cross, containing the letters C S S M L - N D S M D, initials of the words  ('May the holy cross be my light! May the dragon never be my overlord!'). Never tempt me with your vanities! What you offer me is evil. Drink the poison yourself!') and finally, located at the top is the word  which means 'peace'.

Use of the medal

The medal represents a prayer on the part of the user to invoke God’s blessing and protection through the intercession of St. Benedict. There are no special rules prescribed for its use. It may be worn on a chain around the neck, carried on one's person, placed in one’s vehicle, home, or in one’s place of business. It is sometimes incorporated into a crucifix to create a "St. Benedict's Cross", usually with the reverse side as the halo for the corpus.

Lay Oblates of St. Benedict are permitted to wear the Medal of St. Benedict instead of the small black cloth scapular. 

The Blessing of St. Maur is customarily bestowed on the sick using a relic of the True Cross, in hopes of assisting speedy recovery of their health. Since it is often impossible to have a relic of the True Cross, the Sacred Congregation of Rites in 1959 granted permission for St. Benedict Medals to be used instead of the relic of the True Cross to confer the Blessing.

As with a number of other religious articles, "The faithful, who devoutly use an article of devotion (crucifix or cross, rosary, scapular or medal) properly blessed by any priest, obtain a partial indulgence."

Blessing of the medal
Medals of Saint Benedict are sacramentals that may be blessed legitimately by any priest or deacon, not necessarily a Benedictine.

The following English form may be used:

The medal is then sprinkled with holy water.

See also

 Exorcism in Christianity
 Fivefold Scapular
 Miraculous Medal

References

Notes

Citations

External links 

Amulets
Catholic devotions
Devotional medals
Spiritual warfare
Talismans